Destino de un capricho is a 1972 Argentine musical comedy drama film directed by Leo Fleider.

Cast

References

External links

 

1972 films
Argentine comedy-drama films
1970s Spanish-language films
1970s Argentine films
Films directed by Leo Fleider